Osby Municipality (Osby kommun) is a municipality in Scania County in Sweden. Its seat is located in the town of Osby.

The amalgamation during the 1970s' local government reform took place in the area on 1 January 1974, when the former market town Osby (itself instituted as such in 1937) was merged with three adjacent rural municipalities.

Localities
There are 3 localities (or built-up areas) in Osby Municipality.

In the table the localities are listed according to the size of the population as of 31 December 2005. The municipal seat is in bold characters.

Elections

Riksdag

International relations
The municipality is twinned with:

  Gribskov Municipality (formerly Græsted-Gilleleje), Denmark

References
Statistics Sweden

External links

Osby - Official site
Osby.info - local portal
Osby - www.osby.nu
Osby parish

Municipalities of Skåne County